The 2010 Cambodian League season is the 26th season of top-tier football in Cambodia. A total of ten teams are competing in the league, with Nagacorp the defending champions. The season started in March.

Teams
Post Tel Club and Phuchung Neak were relegated to the second level of Cambodian football, Division 1A after ending the 2009 season in the bottom two places. Promoted from the second level were Chhma Khmao and Prek Pra Keila.

Spark FC were renamed to Wat Phnom.

Stadium and locations

League table

Playoffs

Semi-finals

Third place play-off

Final

Champions qualify to 2011 AFC President's Cup.

Top scorers

References

C-League seasons
Cambodia
Cambodia
1